Mary Westbrook Van Deusen (February 13, 1829 – October 16, 1908), publishing under the name Mary Westbrook, was an American author of prose and verse.

Career
She was born Mary Amanda Westbrook in Fishkill, New York, the daughter of Cornelius de Puy Westbrook, a pastor of the Dutch Church in nearby Peekskill, and Sarah (Beekman) Westbrook. In 1865 she married James Lansing Van Deusen of Rondout, New York.

She published both prose and poetry, mainly through the Freeman Company, of Kingston, New York. Her 1883 novel Rachel Du Mont: A Brave Little Maid of the Revolution was about the burning of Kingston during the American Revolution. It was successful enough to go through three editions in one year.

Books
Novels
Rachel Du Mont (1883)
Gertrude Willoughby

Verse
"Voices of My Heart"

References

1829 births
1908 deaths
19th-century American women writers
American children's writers
19th-century American novelists
19th-century American poets
People from Fishkill, New York
Wikipedia articles incorporating text from A Woman of the Century